John Carleton Sjogren was a soldier in the United States Army who received the Medal of Honor in World War II during the campaign to recapture the Philippines from Japanese forces in 1945. Against superior numbers, Sjogren was able to kill 43 enemy soldiers as well as destroying 9 pillboxes.  He was the first of four soldiers from the 40th Division to receive the Medal. After the war, Sjogren served the Michigan National Guard from 1949 to 1953, where he rose to the rank of First Lieutenant and served in the Korean War before leaving the guard.

He is buried in Rockford Cemetery, Rockford, Michigan.

Medal of Honor citation
Sjogren, John C.
Rank and organization:Staff Sergeant,Company I, 160th Infantry Regiment, 40th Infantry Division
Place and date:Near San Jose Hacienda, Negros, Philippine Islands, May 23, 1945
Entered service at:Rockford, Michigan
Citation:
He led an attack against a high precipitous ridge defended by a company of enemy riflemen, who were entrenched in spider holes and supported by well-sealed pillboxes housing automatic weapons with interlocking bands of fire. The terrain was such that only 1 squad could advance at one time; and from a knoll atop a ridge a pillbox covered the only approach with automatic fire. Against this enemy stronghold, S/Sgt. Sjogren led the first squad to open the assault. Deploying his men, he moved forward and was hurling grenades when he saw that his next in command, at the opposite flank, was gravely wounded. Without hesitation he crossed 20 yards of exposed terrain in the face of enemy fire and exploding dynamite charges, moved the man to cover and administered first aid. He then worked his way forward and, advancing directly into the enemy fire, killed 8 Japanese in spider holes guarding the approach to the pillbox. Crawling to within a few feet of the pillbox while his men concentrated their bullets on the fire port, he began dropping grenades through the narrow firing slit. The enemy immediately threw 2 or 3 of these unexploded grenades out, and fragments from one wounded him in the hand and back. However, by hurling grenades through the embrasure faster than the enemy could return them, he succeeded in destroying the occupants. Despite his wounds, he directed his squad to follow him in a systematic attack on the remaining positions, which he eliminated in like manner, taking tremendous risks, overcoming bitter resistance, and never hesitating in his relentless advance. To silence one of the pillboxes, he wrenched a light machinegun out through the embrasure as it was firing before blowing up the occupants with handgrenades. During this action, S/Sgt. Sjogren, by his heroic bravery, aggressiveness, and skill as a soldier, single-handedly killed 43 enemy soldiers and destroyed 9 pillboxes, thereby paving the way for his company's successful advance. For his heroic act in the war the city of Rockford, Michigan had a day for him. They called it Sjogren day on the date of September 14. After serving the two wars he came home to live in peace. John lost his life to cancer.

See also

List of Medal of Honor recipients

Married to Jean both great friends of Col. William F and Metta Courtright and  William P. Courtright who they embraced as the son they never had. 

As their adopted son and behalf of my father and mother who have also passed, John and Jean are deeply missed "William (Bill) Courtright 2019).

John never spoke of his service as few Medal recipients ever do he did what was expected and was very humble in his acknowledgement of it seeing those who fought and died beside him more deserving.

John is remembered as a great man and my memories of him will be passed through my family for generations to come.

John stood the best that America is, has, and will be.

External links

1916 births
1987 deaths
United States Army Medal of Honor recipients
United States Army officers
People from Rockford, Michigan
People from Grand Rapids, Michigan
United States Army personnel of World War II
World War II recipients of the Medal of Honor
Michigan National Guard personnel